Miklós Nagy (8 June 1932 – 29 April 1974) was a Hungarian engineer and politician, who served as Minister of Education from 1973 until his death. He committed suicide because of his serious illness in 1974.

References

1932 births
1974 suicides
Hungarian politicians who committed suicide
Suicides in Hungary
Hungarian communists
Education ministers of Hungary
1974 deaths